Antonio La Torre (1 December 1956) is an Italian athletics coach, Technical Director of Italy national athletics team.

References

External links
 Antonio La Torre at Italian Athletics Federation web site 

Italian athletics coaches
1956 births
Living people